Krishna Damaji Gajbe is a member of the 13th Maharashtra Legislative Assembly. He represents the Armori Assembly Constituency. He belongs to the Bharatiya Janata Party. Gajbe is from the Mana caste. GAjbe is a small trader by profession, and describes himself as a common man. In his victory in the October, 2014 elections, he proved to be a "giant-killer" defeating two time Member of Legislative Assembly, Anandrao Gedam of the Indian National Congress.son of krushna gajbe is Mohit Gajbe

References

Maharashtra MLAs 2014–2019
Bharatiya Janata Party politicians from Maharashtra
Living people
People from Gadchiroli district
Marathi politicians
Year of birth missing (living people)